Jean-Yves Lafesse, stage name of Jean-Yves Lambert (13 March 1957 – 22 July 2021), was a French actor and humorist. He was known for making prank calls, as well as hidden camera pranks.

Biography
Lafesse was born in Pontivy. He left Brittany in 1974. He travelled for four years through Djibouti, Italy, and England, where he joined the punk counterculture in 1976. During his youth, he was a footballer for Stade pontivyen, and he played as a defender.

In 1984, he joined Radio Nova, for which he began making prank calls.

In 1985, Lafesse joined Europe 1 and Canal+, as well as France 2, TF1, France 3, M6, Paris Première, and Télévision Suisse Romande for the radio show Lafestival. For , he hosted a show called Radio carotte, in which he pranked passersby through placing a carrot in their hands. He became known for using his pinky finger as an imitation microphone.

Lafesse published two books: Les Grandes Impostures téléphoniques in 1992 and Petit Précis de l'imposture in 1994. In 2000, he launched a website called Uniqueaumonde.com, which allowed users to see his pranks on the internet. He played the character Commissioner San-Antonio in two audiobooks, adapted from novels by Frédéric Dard (La Rate au court-bouillon and Votez Bérurier).

On 28 March 2014, Lafesse appeared on a stage for the first time in a production of Lafesse en réhet, a show he had written. It was shown at the Palais des congrès de Pontivy in front of 700 people. After a period of silence, he moved to Saint-Germain-en-Laye in 2019 and organized sketches there, as well as in Poissy. Later that year, he left the Paris area and moved back to Brittany. He was recruited by the radio station France Bleu Breizh Izel for the 2019–2020 season, broadcasting humorous tales he wrote with his brother.

Jean-Yves Lafesse died of ALS in Vannes on 22 July 2021 at the age of 64.

Filmography

Cinema
 (1983)
Baby Blood (1990)
La Classe américaine (1993)
 (1998)
 (1999)
Heartbreaker (2010)
 (2019)

Television
J'arrive ! (1982)
 (2014)
 (2019)
Murders in... (2020)

Publications
Les Grandes Impostures téléphoniques (1992)
Petit Précis de l'imposture (1994)
Mes impostures (2011)
Punk Mamy (2019)

References

1957 births
2021 deaths
People from Pontivy
French humorists
Neurological disease deaths in France
Deaths from motor neuron disease